František Hanus may refer to:

 František Hanus (actor) (1916–1991), Czech actor
 František Hanus (footballer) (born 1982), Czech footballer